Mary Louise Boynton (1868 – March 3, 1951) was an American newspaper publisher and editor. She was the personal secretary and partner of actress Maude Adams.

Early life
Louise Boynton was born in Georgetown, Massachusetts, the eldest child of Casimir Whitman Boynton and Eunice Adelia Harriman Boynton. She graduated from Vassar College in 1894.

Career
In 1897, Boynton and her sister Georgie bought a New Jersey newspaper, the Perth Amboy Republican, and ran it as a daily newspaper until 1903, with Louise Boynton as editor in chief. She was credited as editor of her sister's 1914 book, The Efficient Kitchen, and the sisters co-wrote a book of economical recipes, The Golden Grains (1932).

From 1905, Boynton was closely associated with actress Maude Adams, usually described as her personal secretary. A 1913 profile of Adams in Good Housekeeping elaborated, calling Boynton "a companion who is consulted on every momentous question of costume or farm produce; who is present at the trial of every stage effect and is the companion of every country drive; a true helpmeet in the small things of life as well as in the large."

Personal life
Boynton and Adams lived and traveled together from 1905 until Boynton's death in 1951, from an apparent heart attack. Their graves are under a shared headstone, on the grounds of the Cenacle Convent in Ronkonkoma, Long Island.

References

External links

1868 births
1951 deaths
Vassar College alumni
American newspaper publishers (people)
American newspaper editors
People from Georgetown, Massachusetts